This is a list of airlines currently operating in The Cayman Islands.

See also
 List of airlines
 List of defunct airlines of the Cayman Islands

Airlines
Cayman Islands
Cayman Islands